Tina M. Davis is a politician from the U.S. commonwealth of Pennsylvania. A member of the Democratic Party, she is a member of the Pennsylvania House of Representatives for the 141st district.

Davis currently sits on the Rules committee.

References

External links

State Representative Tina Davis official caucus site
Tina Davis (D) official PA House site
Tina Davis for State Representative official campaign site

Living people
Democratic Party members of the Pennsylvania House of Representatives
La Salle University alumni
21st-century American politicians
Year of birth missing (living people)